Dehpul (also Romanized as Dehpūl; also known as Dehbūl, Deh Fūl, Deh Pīl, and Dehpol) is a village in Qarah Kahriz Rural District, Qarah Kahriz District, Shazand County, Markazi Province, Iran. In the 2006 census, its population was measured at 288, in 77 families.

References 

Populated places in Shazand County